The Actors' Equity Association (AEA), commonly called Actors' Equity or simply Equity, is an American labor union representing those who work in live theatrical performance. Performers appearing in live stage productions without a book or through-storyline (vaudeville, cabarets, circuses) may be represented by the American Guild of Variety Artists (AGVA). The AEA works to negotiate quality living conditions, livable wages, and benefits for performers and stage managers. A theater or production that is not produced and performed by AEA members may be called "non-Equity".

Background
Leading up to the Actors' and Producers' strike of 1929, Hollywood and California in general had a series of workers' equality battles that directly influenced the film industry. The films The Passaic Textile Strike (1926), The Miners' Strike (1928) and The Gastonia Textile Strike (1929) gave audience and producers insight into the effect and accomplishments of labor unions and striking. These films were set apart by being current documentaries, not merely melodramas produced for glamor.

In 1896, the first Actors Union Charter was recognized by the American Federation of Labor as an attempt to create a minimum wage for actors being exploited. It was not until January 13, 1913, that the Union Charter failed. It later reemerged as the Actors Equity Association, with more than 111 actors and Francis Wilson as its founding board president.

History

At a meeting held at the Pabst Grand Circle Hotel in New York City, on May 26, 1913, Actors' Equity was founded by 112 professional theater actors, who established its constitution and elected Francis Wilson as president.

Leading up to the association's establishment, a handful of influential actors—known as The Players—held secret organizational meetings at Edwin Booth's The Players at its Gramercy Park mansion. A bronze plaque commemorates the room in which The Players met to establish Actors' Equity. Members included Frank Gillmore, who from was the executive secretary of Actors' Equity from 1918 to 1929 and president from 1929 to 1937.

Actors' Equity joined the American Federation of Labor in 1919, and called a strike seeking recognition as a labor union. The strike ended the dominance of the Producing Managers' Association, including theater owners and producers like Abe Erlanger and his partner, Mark Klaw. The strike increased membership from under 3,000 to approximately 14,000. The Chorus Equity Association, which merged with Actors' Equity in 1955, was founded during the strike.

Equity represented directors and choreographers until 1959, when they broke away and formed their own union.

1929 nationwide actors and producers strike threat

The Actors Equality Strike was a series of walkouts that started in 1927 in local theaters in Los Angeles and quickly grew to the motion picture stage. During the nationwide walkouts, the Academy of Motion Picture Arts and Sciences started issuing contracts to freelance film actors, which led Hollywood's actors and actresses to fear the loss of their jobs. The theater strikes combined with freelance contracts fueled the need for actors and stagehands to strike for better working conditions and pay.

Frank Gillmore, the head and treasurer of the Actor's Equity Association, understood that he would need multiple unions across the country to make a change not only in proper representation and pay, but in actors' ability to negotiate any contract a studio would put out worldwide. On July 20, 1929, the AEA gained its first victory, which gave producers and actors a leg to stand on in their battle for equality. Over 30 days (up to August 20, 1929), Gillmore fought to give the AEA the ability to represent all actors, producers, radio personality, vaudeville performers, and agents in the country. This would also give all power and representation to one organization in order to create a more organized equality strike.

Starting on June 5, 1929, Gillmore attended several meetings in New York with the heads of Broadway. After the meeting, he notified the AEA that appearances in sound and talking motion pictures had been suspended until the outcome of the meetings with the international Studio Crafts Union.

Due to the negotiations and the suspension of contracts through the AEA, studios were desperate for actors to speed up production, which had dropped significantly. The New York Times wrote, "It was pointed out that while the Equality regulations were in effect, about 2000 motion picture contracts, involving salaries said to amount to $500,000 were offered to actors in New York." Any actor who entered into a contract not approved by the AEA would be banished from the union and have to reapply for admission after negotiations were finished.

By December 1929, the AEA was negotiating terms to reset the movie stage under better conditions, but this was the least of its problems. In late December, groups of theater owners and non-represented producers filed lawsuits to claim damages from the AEA's contract holdout. "The plaintiffs not only seek a temporary injunction against the defendants, pending trial on an order to show cause why a permanent injunction should not be granted, but also ask damages of $100,000."

Effects of strike
The AEA allowed small numbers of contracts to be negotiated over the next few years. In 1933, the Screen Actors Guild was created and took the AEA's place as the main representative for movie actors and producers. This allowed the AEA to focus on live productions, such as theatrical performances, while the Screen Actors Guild focused on movie production and non-scripted live performances, such as minstrel, vaudeville, and live radio shows.

Causes
In the 1940s, the AEA stood against segregation.When actors were losing jobs through 1950s McCarthyism and the Hollywood blacklist, the AEA refused to participate. Although its constitution guaranteed its members the right to refuse to work alongside Communists, or a member of a Communist front organization, the AEA did not ban any members. At a 1997 ceremony commemorating the blacklist's 50th anniversary, Richard Masur, then president of the Screen Actors Guild, apologized for its participation in the ban, saying: "Only our sister union, Actors' Equity Association, had the courage to stand behind its members and help them continue their creative lives in the theater. For that, we honor Actors' Equity tonight."

In the 1960s, the AEA played a role in gaining public funding for the arts, including the founding of the National Endowment for the Arts (NEA).

The AEA fought the destruction of historic Broadway theaters. It played a major role in the recognition of the impact the AIDS epidemic on the world of theater, co-founding Broadway Cares/Equity Fights AIDS.

Joining 
There are three ways to become a member of Equity: an AEA contract, Equity Membership Candidacy (EMC) points, or a sister union. If someone is offered a position under an AEA contract, they may join for the term of that contract. Alternatively, one can become a member by generating a number of EMC points. This is done by securing a position at an EMC-participating theater and then registering as a candidate for Equity. For every week one works at a participating theater, one gets a point. Performers are required to earn a minimum of 25 weeks of EMC work along with a $400 initial payment to become official AEA members. One can also become a member by virtue of prior membership in a sister performing arts union: SAG-AFTRA, AGMA, AGVA or GIAA. To qualify that way, one must have been a member of the sister union for at least a year, be a member in good standing of that union, and have worked as a performer under its jurisdiction on a principal or "under-five" contract or at least three days of extra ("background") work.

Contracts 
The AEA has a several different types of contract, with different rules associated with them. Each contract type deals with a specific type of theater venue or production type. These include, but are not limited to: Council of Resident Stock Theatres (CORST), Guest Artist, Letters of Agreement (LoA), League of Resident Theatres (LoRT) Small Professional Theatres (SPT), & Theatre for Young Audiences (TYA).

AEA actors and stage managers are not allowed to work in non-Equity houses or on any productions in which an Equity Agreement has not been signed anywhere within the AEA's jurisdiction.

Presidents 

 1913–1920 Francis Wilson
 1920–1928 John Emerson
 1924 (June 17–August 12) Ralph Morgan (acting president)
 1928–1937 Frank Gillmore
 1937–1938 Burgess Meredith (acting president)
 1938–1940 Arthur Byron
 1940–1946 Bert Lytell
 1946–1952 Clarence Derwent
 1952–1964 Ralph Bellamy
 1964–1973 Frederick O'Neal
 1973–1982 Theodore Bikel
 1982–1985 Ellen Burstyn
 1985–1991 Colleen Dewhurst
 1991–2000 Ron Silver
 2000–2006 Patrick Quinn
 2006–2009 Mark Zimmerman
 2009–2010 Paige Price (acting president)
 2010–2015 Nick Wyman
 2015–present Kate Shindle

See also

 American Federation of Television and Radio Artists
 Canadian Actors' Equity Association
 Clarence Derwent Awards
 Equity, union in the United Kingdom
 Gypsy Robe
 Paul Robeson Award
 Philip Loeb Humanitarian Award
 St. Clair Bayfield Award
 Stage Managers' Association

Footnotes

Further reading
 Attadgie, Shelley. "Combating the Actor's Sacrifice: How to Amend Federal Labor Law to Influence the Labor Practices of Theaters and Incentivize Actors to Fight for Their Rights." Cardozo Law Review 40 (2018): 1045+.
 Baar, K. Kevyne. " ' What Has My Union Done For Me?' The Screen Actors Guild, the American Federation of Television and Radio Artists, and Actors' Equity Association Respond to McCarthy-Era Blacklisting." Film History (2008): 437-455
 Chi, Emily C. "Star quality and job security: The role of the performers' unions in controlling access to the acting profession." Cardozo Arts & Entertainment Law Journal 18 (2000): 1.
 Gemmill, Paul F. Collective Bargaining by Actors: A Study of Trade-Unionism among Performers of the English-Speaking Legitimate Stage in America. Bulletin of the United States Bureau of Labor Statistics, No. 402. Washington, D.C.: U.S. Government Printing Office, 1926.
 Harding, Alfred. The Revolt of the Actors. New York: William Morrow & Company, 1929.
 Holmes, Sean P. Weavers of Dreams, Unite! Actors' Unionism in Early Twentieth-Century America. Urbana, Illinois: University of Illinois Press, 2013.
 Holmes, Sean P. "And the villain still pursued her: The actors’ equity association in Hollywood, 1919–1929." Historical Journal of Film, Radio and Television 25.1 (2005): 27-50.
 Meredith, Mark D. "From dancing halls to hiring halls: Actors' Equity and the closed shop dilemma." Columbia Law Review 96.1 (1996): 178-236.
 Rogers, Lynne. "The Actors’ Revolt". American Heritage, Volume 47, Issue 5, September 1996.

External links

 

 
AFL–CIO
Theatrical organizations in the United States
Trade unions established in 1913
1913 establishments in the United States
Special Tony Award recipients